Billy the Kid Wanted is a 1941 American Western film directed by Sam Newfield. This film is the seventh in the "Billy the Kid" film series produced by PRC from 1940 to 1946, and the first starring Buster Crabbe as Billy the Kid, replacing Bob Steele. The film also features Sam Newfield's son Joel.

Plot 
Tired of always running from the law, Fuzzy leaves his pals Billy and Jeff and heads to Paradise Valley to be a homesteader. However, when he finds himself in trouble and is arrested he sends for them. They find the source of Fuzzy's trouble, Matt Brawley, who controls the town and is running a land swindle.

Cast 
Buster Crabbe as Billy the Kid
Al St. John as Fuzzy
Dave O'Brien as Jeff
Glenn Strange as Matt Brawley
Charles King as Jack Saunders
Slim Whitaker as 2nd Sheriff
Howard Masters as Stan Harper
Choti Sherwood as Jane Harper
Joel Newfield as Joey Harper
Budd Buster as Storekeeper
Frank Ellis as Bart - Henchman

See also
The "Billy the Kid" films starring Buster Crabbe: 
 Billy the Kid Wanted (1941)
 Billy the Kid's Round-Up (1941)
 Billy the Kid Trapped (1942)
 Billy the Kid's Smoking Guns (1942)
 Law and Order (1942) 
 Sheriff of Sage Valley (1942) 
 The Mysterious Rider (1942)
 The Kid Rides Again (1943)
 Fugitive of the Plains (1943)
 Western Cyclone (1943)
 Cattle Stampede (1943)
 The Renegade (1943)
 Blazing Frontier (1943)
 Devil Riders (1943)
 Frontier Outlaws (1944)
 Valley of Vengeance (1944)
 The Drifter (1944) 
 Fuzzy Settles Down (1944)
 Rustlers' Hideout (1944)
 Wild Horse Phantom (1944)
 Oath of Vengeance (1944)
 His Brother's Ghost (1945) 
 Thundering Gunslingers (1945)
 Shadows of Death (1945)
 Gangster's Den (1945)
 Stagecoach Outlaws (1945)
 Border Badmen (1945)
 Fighting Bill Carson (1945)
 Prairie Rustlers (1945) 
 Lightning Raiders (1945)
 Terrors on Horseback (1946)
 Gentlemen with Guns (1946)
 Ghost of Hidden Valley (1946)
 Prairie Badmen (1946)
 Overland Riders (1946)
 Outlaws of the Plains (1946)

External links

References 

1941 films
1941 Western (genre) films
American black-and-white films
American Western (genre) films
Billy the Kid (film series)
Films directed by Sam Newfield
1940s English-language films
1940s American films